Robert Jonathan Bradford (8 June 1941 – 14 November 1981) was a Methodist Minister and a Vanguard Unionist and Ulster Unionist Member of Parliament for the Belfast South constituency in Northern Ireland until his assassination by the Provisional Irish Republican Army (IRA) on 14 November 1981.

Footballer
Bradford was born on 8 June 1941 to a Belfast family resident in Limavady, County Londonderry, due to the wartime evacuation. Bradford's father left the family not long after his birth and his mother died so he was raised by foster parents. A talented footballer, Bradford signed for Glenavon F.C. as a teenager and his displays soon attracted the attentions of the English side Sheffield Wednesday F.C., who invited him to a trial. However, Bradford was not signed by the club and returned to Northern Ireland to resume his career with the then Belfast-based club Distillery.

Religion
Bradford gave up football in 1964, after deciding to train to become a Methodist minister. After spending the rest of the 1960s attached to congregations in East Belfast and Fivemiletown, Bradford was fully ordained in 1970 and given his own parish in the Suffolk area of southwest Belfast. Bradford later resigned from the Methodist ministry in the late 1970s after feeling that he and his fellow ministers were on divergent paths both politically and ecumenically. and would spend the final years of his life without a church. During these years he came to spend time in the 'Bible belt' of the US and became associated with American Evangelicalism. Nevertheless, Bradford claimed to always remain at heart a Methodist and also rejected suggestions that he was to join Ian Paisley's Free Presbyterian Church (which he never did).

Political career
Bradford first became involved with unionism in 1971 when he joined the Orange Order. From here he became more involved in the political side of the movement and stood as a candidate for the Vanguard Progressive Unionist Party in the 1973 Northern Ireland Assembly election in South Antrim, although he was not elected. Bradford was first elected as Member of Parliament for South Belfast in the February 1974 British general election, this time under the banner of the United Ulster Unionist Council (an alliance between the Vanguard, the Democratic Unionist Party and the anti-Brian Faulkner section of the Ulster Unionist Party (UUP) under Harry West), defeating the sitting MP Rafton Pounder, a pro-Faulkner Ulster Unionist. His campaign had been openly supported by the far-right National Front, and at a National Front rally in September 1974, Martin Webster read out a letter of solidarity from Bradford.

Bradford greatly increased his majority in the October election, after Pounder dropped out, and largely maintained this increased majority in 1979. Between 1974 and 1978 he sat for the Vanguard Party until in February 1978 he joined the UUP (then often called the Official Unionist Party), along with Vanguard leader Bill Craig and most of the membership. He was re-elected in 1979 for the UUP.

He was described as a religious and political hardliner, identifying with British Israelism. In one of his speeches he said the causes of the problems in Northern Ireland were down to the Roman Catholic Church, Marxism, and ecumenical confusion.

Death

Bradford was killed by three IRA members, one of them carrying a sub-machine gun, on 14 November 1981. He was hosting a political surgery in a community centre in Finaghy, Belfast.  Kenneth Campbell, the 29-year-old Protestant caretaker in the centre, was killed at the front door by the first outburst of gunfire. An RUC bodyguard was then held at gunpoint, while Bradford was shot several times. As the IRA unit got away, the RUC constable fired three shots at the car they were riding in. 

Secretary of State Jim Prior was verbally abused and jostled by a group of angry loyalists outside the church at his funeral and hissed at by members of the congregation. Ian Paisley also protested against his attendance.

Taoiseach Garret FitzGerald made an expression of sympathy in the Irish parliament Dáil Éireann stating:

The IRA described him as "one of the key people responsible for winding up the loyalist paramilitary sectarian machine", a "propagator of anti-Catholic sectarian hatred", and "a prominent motivator of attacks on Catholics". A number of Catholics were killed by loyalists in retaliation. Years later, it was revealed that the security services had been warned three days before Bradford's death about the IRA plot to assassinate him, but did nothing to prevent it, leading to the claim that they were protecting the life of informers within the IRA.

His seat was won by Martin Smyth, also of the UUP, in a by-election in 1982. A book about Bradford's life, A sword bathed in heaven: The life, faith, and cruel death of the Rev. Robert Bradford B. Th. M.P. (1984), was written by his widow, Norah. It dealt largely with his path to Methodism, although also examined his political career and assassination.

Bibliography
 Bradford, Norah. A sword bathed in heaven: The life, faith, and cruel death of the Rev. Robert Bradford B. Th. M.P. (Pickering paperbacks; 1984). Pickering and Inglis; /

References

External links
Seanad Éireann (Senate of the Republic of Ireland) passes motion of sympathy on assassination of Rev Robert Bradford MP.
NI Conflict Archive on the Internet

1941 births
1981 deaths
Assassinated politicians from Northern Ireland
British terrorism victims
British Israelism
Deaths by firearm in Northern Ireland
Lisburn Distillery F.C. players
Glenavon F.C. players
NIFL Premiership players
Members of the Parliament of the United Kingdom for Belfast constituencies (since 1922)
Methodist ministers
Association footballers from Northern Ireland
People from Limavady
People killed by the Provisional Irish Republican Army
People murdered in Belfast
Terrorism deaths in Northern Ireland
UK MPs 1974
UK MPs 1974–1979
UK MPs 1979–1983
Ulster Unionist Party members of the House of Commons of the United Kingdom
Vanguard Unionist Progressive Party politicians
20th-century Methodist ministers
Methodist ministers from Northern Ireland
Assassinated British MPs
Critics of the Catholic Church
British adoptees
Association footballers not categorized by position
1981 murders in the United Kingdom